Marco Nowak (born July 23, 1990) is a German professional ice hockey defenceman who currently plays for Eisbären Berlin of the Deutsche Eishockey Liga (DEL). He has previously played with the DEG Metro Stars and Nürnberg Ice Tigers.

International play
On 25 January 2022, Nowak was selected to play for Team Germany at the 2022 Winter Olympics.

Career statistics

Regular season and playoffs

International

References

External links

1990 births
Living people
DEG Metro Stars players
Düsseldorfer EG players
Eisbären Berlin players
ETC Crimmitschau players
German ice hockey defencemen
Thomas Sabo Ice Tigers players
Sportspeople from Dresden
Ice hockey players at the 2022 Winter Olympics
Olympic ice hockey players of Germany